Unbreakable Smile is the debut studio album by American singer Tori Kelly. It was released on June 23, 2015, through Capitol Records and Schoolboy Records. The album was executively produced by Max Martin. The album received generally positive reviews from critics.

Unbreakable Smile was preceded by two singles, "Nobody Love" and "Should've Been Us". The album debuted at number two on the US Billboard 200. The reissue of the album features two new tracks, "Hollow" and "Something Beautiful", and an alternate album cover was released on January 29, 2016.

Release and promotion
In April 2015, Kelly announced a North American tour, which is called the Where I Belong Tour which took place through May and June to support Unbreakable Smile. Kelly performed her single "Should've Been Us" along with an interview on Good Morning America on June 22, 2015, the day before the album's release.

"Nobody Love" was released as the album's lead single on February 8, 2015.
"Unbreakable Smile" was officially released on April 27, 2015 as the album's first promotional single. "Should've Been Us" was initially made available as a promotional single along with the album's pre-order on May 12, 2015. Later, it was released to Top 40 radio as the album's second single on June 2, 2015.

"Hollow" was released digitally on October 19, 2015, and released in North America on October 22, 2015, as the third single from the album, and the first from the reissue and was released to Top 40 radio on November 3, 2015.

All of the aforementioned tracks received music videos.

Critical reception

Empty Lighthouse Magazine called the album Kelly's "break into the industry" with applaud to her songwriting and vocals. Music Snake wrote that the album was an "impressive debut" with Kelly being "boldly authentic and effortlessly talented." In a review from Trendio, the album was called "timeless" and lived up to expectations. However, it was said that Kelly should have broken out of her comfort zone a little more. Matthew Scott Donnelly from PopCrush rated the album 3 out of 5. He wrote that the first half of the album surpassed the second half and closed with "Kelly’s got pipes that could stop an Olympic sprinter in her tracks—and she’s got a great album in her—but Unbreakable Smile, for its undeniable glint, could do with a bit of elective orthodontia." AndPop'''s Merna Jibrail complimented the album's variety although she noted the lack of singles that could have potentially built more momentum and promotion for the album.

Commercial performance
The album was predicted to sell 65,000 units in its first week and debut in the top five of the US Billboard 200. The album debuted at number two on the Billboard'' 200, with 75,000 album-equivalent units, including 65,000 pure album sales.

Reissue
The album was re-released on January 29, 2016. "Hollow" was released on October 22, 2015, as the first single from the new edition of the album. In addition to the standard reissue of the album, an exclusive version of the re-release was made available at Target stores. In addition to the two new tracks, it retains the two additional bonus tracks from the original exclusive version of the album. The iTunes bonus tracks were included on the reissue of the album on iTunes everywhere except North America.

Track listing

Notes
The Target bonus tracks are also featured on the reissue as tracks 17 and 18 except in North America.
The iTunes bonus tracks are also featured as tracks 15 and 16 (UK iTunes bonus track on track 17) before the reissue bonus tracks everywhere except North America.

Charts

Weekly charts

Year-end charts

Release history

Certifications

References

2015 debut albums
Tori Kelly albums
Capitol Records albums
Albums produced by Toby Gad
Albums produced by Malay (record producer)
Albums produced by Max Martin
Albums produced by Ilya Salmanzadeh
Albums produced by Johan Carlsson